This is a bibliography of water clocks.

Overview of water clocks and other time instruments 
 
 
 
 
 
 
 .

Arabic & Islamic water clocks 
 
 
 
 
  (Reprinted in )

Babylonian water clocks 
 
 
 
 
  (Reprinted in )

Chinese water clocks

Egyptian water clocks 
 
  
 
 
 
  (Reprinted in )

European water clocks

Greek and Alexandrian water clocks

Indian water clocks

Korean water clocks 
 
 
 
 
 From the Veritable Records of the Joseon Dynasty:
 Hyeonjong Shillock (Veritable Records of King Hyeonjong), 1669
 Jungjong Shillok (Veritable Records of King Jungjong), 1536.
 Sejong Shillock (Veritable Records of King Sejong), Chapter. 65, AD 1434 and Chapter. 80, AD 1438.

Mesopotamian water clocks

Russian ancient water clocks

Present-day water clocks

Other topics on water clocks and related material

Non-English resources 
 
 
 
 
 
 
 
 
 
 
 
 
 

Water clocks
Lists of publications in science